Mermis is a genus of nematodes belonging to the family Mermithidae.

The genus has almost cosmopolitan distribution.

Species
At least 11 species currently belong to the genus:

 Mermis athysanota 
 Mermis changodudus 
 Mermis gigantea 
 Mermis kenyensis 
 Mermis mirabilis 
 Mermis nigrescens 
 Mermis papillus 
 Mermis paranigrescens 
 Mermis quirindiensis 
 Mermis savaiiensis 
 Mermis xianensis

References

Mermithidae